was the 42nd emperor of Japan, according to the traditional order of succession.

Monmu's reign spanned the years from 697 through 707.

Traditional narrative
Before his ascension to the Chrysanthemum Throne, his personal name (imina) was Karu-shinnō.

He was a grandson of Emperor Tenmu and Empress Jitō. He was the second son of Prince Kusakabe. Monmu's mother was Princess Abe, a daughter of Emperor Tenji. Monmu's mother would later accede to the throne herself, and she would be known as Empress Genmei.

Events of Monmu's life
Karu-shinnō was only six years old when his father, Crown Prince Kusakabe, died.

 697:  In the 10th year of Jitō-tennōs reign (持統天皇十年), the empress abdicated; and the succession (senso) was received by a grandson of Emperor Tenmu.  Shortly thereafter, Emperor Monmu is said to have acceded to the throne (sokui).

Emperor Monmu ruled until his death in 707, at which point he was succeeded by his mother, Empress Genmei, who was also his first cousin once removed and his first cousin twice removed. He left a young son by Fujiwara no Miyako, a daughter of Fujiwara no Fuhito: Obito no miko (Prince Obito), who eventually became Emperor Shōmu.

Emperor Monmu's reign lasted 10 years.  He died at the age of 25.

The actual site of Monmu's grave is known.  This emperor is traditionally venerated at a memorial Shinto shrine (misasagi) at Nara.

The Imperial Household Agency designates this location as Monmu's mausoleum.  It is formally named Hinokuma no Ako no oka no e no misasagi.

Kugyō
 is a collective term for the very few most powerful men attached to the court of the Emperor of Japan in pre-Meiji eras.

In general, this elite group included only three to four men at a time.  These were hereditary courtiers whose experience and background would have brought them to the pinnacle of a life's career.  During Monmu's reign, this apex of the  Daijō-kan included:
 Daijō-daijin, Osakabe-shinnō.
 Sadaijin
 Udaijin
 Naidaijin, Nakatomi Kamako no Muraji.
 Dainagon, Fujiwara Fuhito.

Eras of Monmu's reign
Conventional modern scholarship seems to have determined that the years of Monmu's reign are encompassed within more than one era name or nengō.
 Taihō (era)  (701–704)
 Keiun       (704–708)

Non-nengō period
The initial years of Monmu's reign are not linked by scholars to any era or nengō.  The Taika era innovation of naming time periods – nengō – languished until Monmu reasserted an imperial right by proclaiming the commencement of Taihō in 701.
 See Japanese era name – "Non-nengo periods"
 See Monmu period (697–701).

In this context, Brown and Ishida's translation of Gukanshō offers an explanation about the years of Empress Jitō's reign which muddies a sense of easy clarity in the pre-Taiho time-frame:
"The eras that fell in this reign were: (1) the remaining seven years of Shuchō [(686+7=692?)]; and (2) Taika, which was four years long [695–698]. (The first year of this era was kinoto-hitsuji [695].)  ... In the third year of the Taka era [697], Empress Jitō yielded the throne to the Crown Prince."

Consorts and children
Bunin: Fujiwara no Miyako (藤原宮子, d. 754), Fujiwara no Fuhito’s daughter
First Son: Prince Obito (首皇子) later Emperor Shōmu

Hin: Ki no Kamado-no-iratsume (紀竃門娘)

Hin: Ishikawa no Tone-no-iratsume (石川刀子娘)
Takamado Hironari (Hiroyo)

Ancestry

See also
 Emperor of Japan
 List of Emperors of Japan
 Imperial cult
 Taihō Code

Notes

References
 Brown, Delmer M. and Ichirō Ishida, eds. (1979).  Gukanshō: The Future and the Past. Berkeley: University of California Press. ;  
 Ponsonby-Fane, Richard Arthur Brabazon. (1959).  The Imperial House of Japan. Kyoto: Ponsonby Memorial Society. 
 Titsingh, Isaac. (1834). Nihon Ōdai Ichiran; ou,  Annales des empereurs du Japon.  Paris: Royal Asiatic Society, Oriental Translation Fund of Great Britain and Ireland.  
 Varley, H. Paul. (1980). Jinnō Shōtōki: A Chronicle of Gods and Sovereigns. New York: Columbia University Press. ;  

 
 

683 births
707 deaths
7th-century monarchs in Asia
7th-century Japanese monarchs
8th-century Japanese monarchs
Japanese emperors
People of Asuka-period Japan
Sons of emperors